Asphalt Massaka is the debut album by German rapper Farid Bang. It released on 4 July 2008 over German Dream Entertainment.

Musical style 
The album contains mainly battle rap tracks and diss tracks, including "Asphalt Massaka" and "Der Härteste im Land". Except for "Zweimal im Leben", a storytelling track, and "Jüngste Tag", a thoughtful song.

According to an interview with Toxik from hiphop.de, Farid Bang explained that his disses and insults towards some German rappers are only to be taken "sportive".

Track listing 

Samples
"Wer ist Düsseldorf" contains a sample of "Seven Notes in Black" by The Vince Tempera Orchestra

Marketing
A video was filmed for the track  "An die Wand". This album didn´t rise in the charts.

References

External links
http://www.16bars.de/db/album/580/asphalt-massaka/
http://www.cd-lexikon.de/album_farid-bang-asphalt-massaka.htm
http://www.hiphop.de/magazin/video/detail/farid-bang-interview-part-1/

Farid Bang albums
2008 debut albums